Robert Budreau is a Canadian film director, screenwriter and producer.

Budreau was born in London, Ontario, and raised in Ingersoll. He made a number of short films before releasing his feature debut, That Beautiful Somewhere, in 2006. His second feature film, Born to Be Blue, followed in 2015. In 2018 he released Stockholm, for which he won the award for Best Adapted Screenplay at the 7th Canadian Screen Awards and the Directors Guild of Canada's DGC Award for Best Direction in a Feature Film.

His fourth feature film, Delia's Gone, entered production in 2020 and is slated for future release.

Through his production firm Lumanity Productions, Budreau has also produced short and feature films by other directors.

Filmography
 Dylanology  (2002)
 The Multiple Selves of Hannah Maynard (2003)
 Dream Recording (2003)
 Photographic Fate (2003)
 Do No Harm (2004)
 Judgment Call (2004)
 The Unfolding (2004)
 Yesteryears (2005)
 Welcome (2005)
 Dry Whiskey (2005)
 Drag (2006)
 Sunshine Swim Team (2006)
 The Secret Miracle (2006)
 The Unspoken Promise (2006)
 That Beautiful Somewhere (2006)
 Sunshine Swim Team (2008)
 As You Like It (2010)
 The Boss (2010)
 Bodyslam (2013)
 Solo (2013)
 Bank$tas / Cubicle Warriors (2014)
 Born to Be Blue (2015)
 Stockholm (2018)
 Delia's Gone (2022)

References

External links 

Living people
Film directors from London, Ontario
Writers from London, Ontario
1974 births
Best Screenplay Genie and Canadian Screen Award winners
21st-century Canadian screenwriters
Film producers from Ontario